Dáire Doimthech (Dáire "poor house"), alias Dáire Sírchréchtach ("the ever-wounded"), son of Sithbolg, was a legendary King of Tara and High King of Ireland, and one of the eponymous ancestors of the proto-historical Dáirine and historical Corcu Loígde of Munster. A son of his was Lugaid Loígde (a quo Corcu Loígde), an ancestor of Lugaid Mac Con. In the Scéla Mosauluim, Dáire Doimthech is referred to as one of the five kings of Tara from Munster, or alternatively one of five Dáires to rule at Tara.

He may at one time have been partly identical with Dáire mac Degad, father of Cú Roí, although traditions concerning him or them appear to have diverged at an early period, following regional paths. Scholars in medieval times were aware that both were believed to be ancestors of the Dáirine. In fact in one manuscript, as Dairi Sirchrechtaig, he is listed as the father of Cú Roí, and through him an ancestor of Fiatach Finn, a quo the Dál Fiatach of Ulster, son of Fuirme mac Con Roí. T. F. O'Rahilly saw even less distinction between these figures, stating that "Cú Roí and Dáire are ultimately one and the same".

Eochaid Étgudach, a High King of Ireland, was another son of Dáire Doimthech, apparently misplaced chronologically by medieval scholars.

He may be listed, if chronologically misplaced, as Dáire Drechlethan in the Baile Chuinn Chétchathaig.

Reign
Despite his prominence as an ancestral figure, little is recalled in Irish legend of Dáire's reign. However, it appears to have been remembered as strong, and in this way is typical for the Dáirine in legend, and as they were portrayed by later historians and storytellers. A passage of poetry in the Old Irish Scéla Mosauluim is translated by Kuno Meyer:

alternative translation:

The Five Lugaids

See also
 Dáire
 List of High Kings of Ireland

Notes

References

 Edel Bhreathnach (ed.), The Kingship and Landscape of Tara. Dublin: Four Courts Press for the Discovery Programme. 2005.
 Margaret E. Dobbs, The History of the Descendants of Ir, in Zeitschrift für celtische Philologie 13 (1921): 308–59; continued in Zeitschrift für celtische Philologie 14 (1923): 44–144.
 Eoin MacNeill, Celtic Ireland. Academy Press. 1981 (reissue with new intro. and notes by Donnchadh Ó Corráin of original Martin Lester Ltd edition, 1921).
 Kuno Meyer (ed. & tr.), Fianaigecht: being a collection of hitherto inedited Irish poems and tales relating to Finn and his Fiana, with an English translation. Todd Lecture Series, Royal Irish Academy, Volume 16.  Dublin: Hodges Figgis. 1910.
 Michael A. O'Brien (ed.) with intr. by John V. Kelleher, Corpus genealogiarum Hiberniae. DIAS. 1976. / partial digital edition: Donnchadh Ó Corráin (ed.), Genealogies from Rawlinson B 502. University College, Cork: Corpus of Electronic Texts. 1997.
 John O'Donovan (ed.), "The Genealogy of Corca Laidhe", in Miscellany of the Celtic Society. Dublin. 1849. alternative scan
 T. F. O'Rahilly, Early Irish History and Mythology. Dublin Institute for Advanced Studies. 1946.
 Julius Pokorny, "Beiträge zur ältesten Geschichte Irlands (3. Érainn, Dári(n)ne und die Iverni und Darini des Ptolomäus)", in Zeitschrift für celtische Philologie 12 (1918): 323–57.
 Whitley Stokes (ed. & tr.), "Cóir Anmann (Fitness of Names)", in Whitley Stokes and Ernst Windisch, Irische Texte mit Wörterbuch. Volume 3, Parts 1–2. Leipzig: Verlag von S. Hirzel. 1891 (1); 1897 (2). pp. 285–444. alternative scan I alternative scan II

Other
 Ireland's History in Maps: Mumu by Dennis Walsh
 Scela Mosauluim by Dan M. Wiley

Legendary High Kings of Ireland